The Men's giant slalom competition of the Lillehammer 1994 Olympics was held at Hafjell.

The defending world champion was Kjetil André Aamodt of Norway, as well as the defending World Cup giant slalom champion and leader of the 1994 World Cup.

Results

References 

Men's giant slalom
Winter Olympics